Miss World America 2017, also referred to as America's Miss World 2017, was the 9th edition of the Miss World America pageant and it was held in the Linda Chapin Theater in the Orange County Convention Center in Orlando, Florida and was won by Clarissa Bowers of Florida. She was crowned by outgoing titleholder, Audra Mari of North Dakota. Bowers went on to represent the United States at the Miss World 2017 Pageant in Sanya, China later that year. She finished in the Top 40 at Miss World.

Results

Placements

Challenge Events

Beauty with a Purpose

Interview

Multimedia

Top Model

Sport & Fitness

Judges
Contestants were evaluated by separate panels of judges for the preliminary and final competitions.

Final Judges

 Charles Woodson – Miss World America Sports Challenge Head Coach
 Jefre – creative concept artist for the new Miss World America and Miss Teen World America crowns
 Cyrus Frakes-King
 Wendy Oliver
 Davonda Simmons
 Dr. John Cavanaugh
 Ieena Duggal

Preliminary Judges

 Jefre – creative concept artist for the new Miss World America and Miss Teen World America crowns
 Cyrus Frakes-King 
 Wendy Oliver 
 Davonda Simmons
 Antoinette Romero
 Rene Bionat
 Cary Ombres

Multimedia Competition Judges
 Ed Huckfelt
 Sarah Jane Waddell – Miss World Trinidad & Tobago 2014
 GL Rivera
 Ellie McKeating – Miss World Scotland 2014

Beauty with a Purpose Judges
 Frankie Cena – Mr World Canada 2012
 Courtney Thorpe – Miss World Australia 2014
 Tracy Galloway
 Victoria Mendoza – Miss World America 2015 from Arizona

Contestants
The Miss World America 2017 contestants are

Notes

Withdrawals
 - Kayleen Workman

Returns
Last competed in 2015:

Did not Compete

Crossovers
Contestants who either competed in or will be competing in other beauty pageants:

Miss World America
2016: : Shivali Patel (1st Runner-up)
2016: : Michaela Rose Kenny (Withdrew)
2016: : Sasha Perea (2nd Runner-up)
2018: : Shivali Patel (2nd Runner-up)
2019: : Marjana Chowdhury (Top 25; as )

Miss America
2016: : Alexandra Curtis

Miss USA
2015: : Maureen Ann Montagne (Top 15)
2016: : Emanii Davis (2nd Runner-up)
2019: : Mariela Pepin (Top 10)
2020: : Katerina Villegas (as )
2021: : Sasha Perea (as )

Miss Teen USA
2014: : Mariela Pepin

Miss U.S. International
2016: : Katerina Villegas (1st Runner-up)
2016: : JoAnn Emale (as Southern States; Miss Congeniality)

Miss Universe
2014: : Evelyn Abena Appiah (as )

Miss Earth USA
2018: : Lili Klainer (Top 12)
2019: : Emanii Davis (Winner)
2019: : Alexandra Curtis (Top 12)
2019: : Lili Klainer (as Midatlantic)

Miss Earth
2019: : Emanii Davis (1st Runner-up; Miss Earth Air; as )

Face of Beauty International
2016 : : JoAnn Emale (as )

National American Miss Jr. Teen
2011: : Shivali Patel (2nd runner-up)

Miss Asia Pacific International
2018: : Marjana Chowdhury (Top 20; as )

Mutya ng Pilipinas
2013: : Maureen Ann Montagne (1st Runner-Up)

Miss World Philippines
2018: : Maureen Ann Montagne (Miss Eco Philippines; as  Batangas)

Miss Eco International
2019: : Maureen Ann Montagne (1st Runner-Up; as )

Binibining Pilipinas
2021: : Maureen Ann Montagne (Binibining Pilipinas Globe 2021; as  Batangas)

Miss Globe
2021: : Maureen Ann Montagne (Winner; as )

Miss Intercontinental
2022: : Mariela Pepin (1st runner-up; as )

References

External links
Miss World Official Website
Miss World America Official Website

2017 in Florida
2017 beauty pageants
2017